This is a list of the hills of the Peak District of England.  Most lie within the Peak District National Park, but others lie outside its borders.  The list is sorted by absolute height, then by relative height.   Marilyns are marked in boldface. Kinder Scout and Bleaklow are the Peak District's only mountains, with summit elevations over 600m and rising more than 30m above the surrounding land (although by other definitions Bleaklow does not meet the prominence threshold of a mountain).

Sources 

 Hill Bagging (the online version of the Database of British and Irish Hills)
 GetOutside (Ordnance Survey)

References 

 
Peak District